Chetna Pandya is an English actress. She is known for her roles as Joyce in Channel 4's comedy series 'Feel Good' (2020) and Carol Tomlin in the ITV comedy-drama The Trouble with Maggie Cole (2020). She also played Coach Singh in the Netflix series Heartstopper (2022).

Early life
Pandya was born in the northwest London Borough of Brent. She graduated with a Bachelor of Arts in Performing Arts from the Mountview Academy of Theatre Arts in 2004.

Filmography

Stage

References

External links
 
 

Living people
21st-century English actresses
Alumni of the Mountview Academy of Theatre Arts
British film actresses
English film actresses
English television actresses
People from the London Borough of Brent
Year of birth missing (living people)